Melittia usambara is a moth of the family Sesiidae. It is known from Tanzania.

References

Endemic fauna of Tanzania
Sesiidae
Insects of Tanzania
Moths of Africa
Moths described in 1917